Gopu may refer to:

Typist Gopu (”டைப்பிஸ்ட்” கோபு), a Tamil stage and film actor
Chitralaya Gopu (சித்ராலயா கோபு), an Indian screenwriter and director who works in the Tamil cinema
C. Gopu, an Indian politician and former Member of the Legislative Assembly of Tamil Nadu
Archbishop Joseph Mark Gopu (September 19, 1953 – February 28, 1971) Roman Catholic Archdiocese of Hyderabad
A nickname of S. Sreesanth, Indian cricketer